Mad Max Beyond Thunderdome: Original Motion Picture Soundtrack is the soundtrack album to the movie of the same name, starring Mel Gibson and Tina Turner. The album was originally released in 1985 on the Capitol Records label and reissued numerous times on different labels.

Background 
In addition to 26 minutes of the original orchestral score composed by Maurice Jarre and performed by the Royal Philharmonic Orchestra, the album includes Tina Turner's US #2 and UK #3 single "We Don't Need Another Hero (Thunderdome)", which played over the end titles of the film. The single was released the year after Turner's comeback with the Private Dancer album and its series of hit singles. "We Don't Need Another Hero" was written and produced by Terry Britten and Graham Lyle (who also wrote "What's Love Got to Do with It") and appears on the album both as an extended vocal version and an extended instrumental, tracks originally released as the A- and B-sides of the 12" single. The vocal 7" mix has since appeared on the hits compilations Simply The Best in 1991 and All the Best in 2004. The alternate 7" instrumental mix remains unreleased on CD. The song received a Golden Globe nomination for Best Original Song in 1986 and a 1986 Grammy nomination for Best Pop Vocal Performance, Female.

The second Tina Turner track on the album, "One of the Living" (U.S. #15), was the film's opening titles song, produced by Mike Chapman and composed by Holly Knight - the team behind "Better Be Good To Me" - and also credited to Knight's band Device on both the film's end titles and the original vinyl album. Released as the follow-up single to "We Don't Need Another Hero", "One of the Living" was also remixed for both the 7" and 12" singles. Aside from the 7" Remix appearing on The Platinum Collection three-disc CD set in 2009, the 7" Dub, 12" Special Remix, 12" Dub and 12" Instrumental versions, co-produced and mixed by Steve Thompson and Michael Barbiero, all remain unreleased on CD. "One of the Living" won Turner a Grammy Award in 1985 for Best Rock Vocal Performance, Female.

The album is not available digitally. Tracks "We Don't Need Another Hero (Thunderdome)" and "One of the Living" were included in deluxe edition of 30th anniversary issue of Tina Turner's album Private Dancer.

Track listing 

† Performed by the Royal Philharmonic Orchestra

Personnel 

Musicians
 Tina Turner – lead vocals (tracks 1-2),  additional background vocals (1) 
 The Kings House School Choir – choir vocals (tracks 1, 3)                                                                        
 Charlie Morgan – drums, additional percussion (tracks 1, 3)
 Nick Glennie-Smith – keyboards (tracks 1, 3)
 Graham Broad – percussion instruments (tracks 1, 3)
 Tim Cappello – saxophone (tracks 1, 3), saxophone solo (2)
 Terry Britten – guitar, bass guitar (tracks 1, 3)
 Gene Black – backing vocals, guitar (track 2)
 Holly Knight – keyboards, music programming, backing vocals (track 2)
 Royal Philharmonic Orchestra – orchestra (tracks 4-6)
 Maurice Jarre – orchestral conductor (tracks 4-6)
 Barry Griffith –  concertmaster (tracks 4-6)
 Charles McMahon –  didgeridoo (tracks 4-6)
 Cynthia Millar – ondes Martenot (tracks 4-6)
 Dominique Kim – ondes Martenot (tracks 4-6)
 Jeanne Loriod – ondes Martenot (tracks 4-6)

Production
 Tracks 1 and 3 recorded at Mayfair Studios, London.
 Track 2 recorded at Cherokee Studios, Los Angeles.
 Terry Britten – record producer (tracks 1, 3)
 John Hudson – sound engineer, sound mix (tracks 1, 3)
 Mike Chapman – producer (track 2)
 Humberto Gatica – remix, co-producer (track 2)
 Maurice Jarre – producer (tracks 4-6)
 Christopher Palmer – assistant to Maurice Jarre (tracks 4-6)
 Dick Lewzey – sound recording engineer (tracks 4-6)
 Tim Pennington – assistant sound recording engineer (tracks 4-6)

Deluxe Edition 

In 2010, a deluxe edition of the soundtrack was released and includes Maurice Jarre's complete, intended score with music cues that were ultimately replaced in the final film by Tina Turner's songs. Although Jarre's alternate cues from the original album were included as bonus tracks, Turner's songs were not included, due to licensing issues (Warner Music currently owns copyrights to Turner's songs, at the time it was EMI).

Disc 1:

Disc 2:

Charts and certifications

Weekly charts

Year-end charts

Certifications and sales

References 

Mad Max music
1985 soundtrack albums
Tina Turner soundtracks
Capitol Records soundtracks
Action film soundtracks